Geoffrey Andrews may refer to:

Geoffrey Andrews (actor) in Once Upon a Crime
Geoff Andrews, musician with Exodus

See also
Jeffrey Andrews (disambiguation)